Mieming is a municipality in the Imst district and is located 19 km east of Imst and 6 km west of Telfs. Main sources of income are agriculture and Summer tourism.

Population

References

External links

Mieming Range
Cities and towns in Imst District